The Howard R. Marraro Prize is a biennial prize given to a writer by the Modern Language Association.

Description
The prize is awarded every second year to honor the author of a scholarly work on Italian literature or comparative Italian literature. The prize is open only to members of the association.

The 2017 prize will be awarded for a book published in 2015 or 2016.

Notable winners
Past winners of the prize include:
2015 - Marilyn Migiel, Cornell University, for The Ethical Dimension of the Decameron
2013 - Justin Steinberg, University of Chicago, for Dante and the Limits of the Law
2011 - Marco Ruffini, Northwestern University, for Art without an Author: Vasari’s Lives and Michelangelo’s Death
2009 - Christine Poggi, University of Pennsylvania, for Inventing Futurism: The Art and Politics of Artificial Optimism; Jane Tylus, New York University, for Reclaiming Catherine of Siena: Literacy, Literature, and the Signs of Others
2007 - Diana Robin, Chicago, Illinois, for Publishing Women: Salons, the Press, and the Counter-Reformation in Sixteenth-Century Italy
2005 - Christian Moevs, University of Notre Dame, for The Metaphysics of Dante's Comedy
2003 - Marilyn Migiel, Cornell University, for A Rhetoric of the Decameron
2001 - Ellen V. Nerenberg, Wesleyan University, for Prison Terms: Representing Confinement during and after Italian Fascism

References

External links
 

Academic awards